A supertaster is a person whose sense of taste is of far greater intensity than the average person, having an elevated taste response.  

Some studies also show that increased sensitivity to bitter tastes may be a cause of selective eating.

History 
The term originated with experimental psychologist Linda Bartoshuk, who has spent much of her career studying genetic variation in taste perception. In the early 1980s, Bartoshuk and her colleagues noticed some individuals tested in the laboratory seemed to have an elevated taste response and called them supertasters.

This increased taste response is not the result of response bias or a scaling artifact but appears to have an anatomical or biological basis.

Phenylthiocarbamide 
In 1931, Arthur L. Fox, a DuPont chemist, discovered that some people found phenylthiocarbamide (PTC) to be bitter while others found it tasteless. In the year 1931, American Association for the Advancement of Science meeting, Fox collaborated with Albert F. Blakeslee, a geneticist, to have attendees taste PTC: 65% found it bitter, 28% found it tasteless, and 6% described other taste qualities. Subsequent work revealed that the ability to taste PTC was genetic.

Propylthiouracil 
In the 1960s, Roland Fischer was the first to link this ability to taste PTC, and the related compound propylthiouracil (PROP), to food preference and body type. Today, PROP has replaced PTC in taste research because of a faint sulfurous odor and safety concerns with PTC. As described above, Bartoshuk and colleagues discovered that the taster group could be further divided into medium tasters and supertasters. Research suggests 25% of the population are non-tasters, 50% are medium tasters, and 25% are supertasters.

Cause

The exact cause of heightened response to taste in humans has yet to be elucidated. A review found associations between supertasters and the presence of the TAS2R38 gene, the ability to taste PROP and PTC, and an increased number of fungiform papillae.

In addition, it is also hypothesized that environmental causes are likely to play a substantial role in sensitive taste. The exact mechanisms by which these may act are still unknown. An evolutionary advantage for elevated taste sensitivity is also still being determined. In some environments, a heightened taste response, particularly to bitterness, would represent an important advantage in avoiding potentially toxic plant alkaloids. However, an increased response to bitterness may limit approach behavior for various palatable foods.

TAS2R38 
The bitter-taste-receptor gene TAS2R38 has been associated with the ability to taste PROP and PTC. However, it has not been demonstrated to be a causal mechanism of the supertaster phenomenon. Still, the T2R38 genotype has been linked to a preference for sweetness in children, avoidance of alcoholic beverages, the increased prevalence of colon cancer (because of inadequate vegetable consumption), and avoidance of cigarette smoking.

Prevalence

Women 
Women are more likely to be supertasters, as are those from Asia, South America, and Africa. Female supertasters have a lower body mass index and better cardiovascular health. This can be due to the fact that supertasters do not have a high predilection for sweet or high-fat foods.

Identification
The tongue's fungiform papillae are revealed with blue food dye.

Supertasters were initially identified based on the perceived intensity of propylthiouracil (PROP) compared to a reference salt solution. Supertasters consume more salt in comparison to those with average taste. Because supertasters have a larger sense of taste than medium or non-tasters, this can cause Image scaling artifacts. Subsequently, salt has been replaced with a non-oral gustatory standard. Therefore, if two individuals rate the same gustatory stimulus at a comparable perceptual intensity, but one gives a rating twice as large for the bitterness of a PROP solution, the experimenter can be confident the difference is real and not merely the result of how the person is using the scale. Today, a phenylthiocarbamide (PTC) test strip is used to help determine if someone is a low taster. The general population tastes this as bitter about 75% of the time.

Many studies do not include a cross-modal reference and categorize individuals based on the bitterness of a concentrated PROP solution or PROP-impregnated paper. Supertasters tend to have more fungiform papillae and pain receptors than tasters and non-tasters. It is also possible to make a reasonably accurate self-diagnosis at home by carefully examining the tongue and looking for the number of fungiform papillae. Blue food dye can make this easier. Being a supertaster or non-taster is part of normal variation in the human population, as are eye color and hair color, so no treatment is needed to avoid cigarette smoking.

Specific food sensitivities

Although individual food preference for supertasters cannot be typified, documented examples for either lessened preference or consumption include:

 Certain alcoholic beverages (gins, tequilas, and hoppy beers)
 Brassica oleracea cultivars (become very sulfurous, especially if overcooked)
 Brussels sprouts
 Cabbage
 Kale
 Coffee 
 Chocolate
 Grapefruit juice 
 Green tea 
 Watercress, mustard greens, horseradish, dandelion greens, rutabaga and turnip
 Soy products 
 Carbonated water 
 Mushrooms
 Anise and licorice
 Lower-sodium foods
Hot-spicy foods

Other foods may also show altered patterns of preference and consumption, but only indirect evidence exists:
 Tonic water – quinine is more bitter to supertasters
 Olives – for a given concentration, salt is more intense in supertasters

See also
 Sensory processing sensitivity
 Tetrachromacy
 Hypergeusia

References

External links

  (thiourea testing)
 How we taste – and the truth about 'supertasters'. An interview with sensory scientist Juyun Lim of Oregon State University and winemaker John Eliassen (March 29, 2011)
Along with citation 5: Title: Olfaction and taste. Di Lorenzo, P.M., and Youngtentob, S.L. 2010. In M. Gallagher and R.J. Nelson (Eds.), Handbook of psychology, (Vol. 3): Biological psychology. New York: Wiley.

Gustation
Perception